Dr Elizabeth Margaret Farrelly (born Dunedin, New Zealand), is a Sydney-based author, architecture critic, essayist, columnist and speaker who was born in New Zealand but later became an Australian citizen. She has contributed to current debates about aesthetics and ethics; design, public art and architecture; urban and natural environments; society and politics, including criticism of the treatment of Julian Assange. Profiles of her have appeared in the New Zealand Architect, Urbis, The Australian Financial Review, the Australian Architectural Review, and Australian Geographic.

Farrelly's range of interests and contributions are wide enough to have caused her to be described by broadcaster Geraldine Doogue as a "Renaissance woman". She was elected to the 2021 board of the National Trust of Australia (NSW).

Her portrait by Mirra Whale was a finalist in the 2015 Archibald Prize at the Art Gallery of New South Wales.

Education and training
Farrelly was born in Dunedin, New Zealand and trained as an architect in Auckland. She left New Zealand in 1983 for London, moved to Sydney in October 1988 and became an Australian citizen in 1991. She holds a PhD in architecture from the University of Sydney. Her thesis examined of the intellectual, cultural and political background to development control in Sydney's city centre from 1900–1960.

Career

Architectural practice 
Farrelly practised as an architect in London until 1988, working at Pollard Thomas and Edwards Architects, London; at JASMaD Architects, Auckland; and Warren and Mahoney, Christchurch.

Public service 
In Sydney, she served as an independent Councillor of the City of Sydney from 1991 to 1995, where she was a member of the Central Sydney Planning Committees, Chair of the Civic Design Sub-Committee and member with Paul Keating of the Project Control Group for the East Circular Quay redevelopment adjacent to the Sydney Opera House. Her interest focussed on the quality of the city's public spaces. She served as a juror for design awards such as Parramatta Design Excellence Awards and the Royal Australian Institute of Architects Awards.
Farrelly also ran in the 2022 Strathfield state by-election, coming in 3rd place and receiving 9.85% of total first preference votes. She is an independent candidate for the NSW Legislative Council in the 2023 election.

Teaching 
Farrelly has taught at the University of Sydney as well as the University of New South Wales where she is Associate Professor (Practice) in the UNSW Graduate School of Urbanism; the University of Technology, Sydney, where she was Adjunct Associate Professor of Architecture; the University of Auckland; the Royal College of Art, London; the Humberside Polytechnic and the Architectural Association School of Architecture, London. Farrelly has set writing for Wikipedia as a task for post-graduate students, and has commented that its demand for every input to be traceable and published, enables "genuine crowd-sourcing of scholarship" and is both "a revelation and a revolution".

Criticism and commentary 
As a professional architecture critic, Farrelly has quoted a study saying that architecture is "the most public art form and, curiously, the least subject to public debate" but that its task is to "distinguish the good, the bad and the reasons". As an urban design professional, she wrote: "Towns are public things. They centre on shared delight, with roosting space not just for the rich but for all, and not just for the body, but the soul." Her essays have been published internationally in specialist, professional and academic journals, including The Architectural Review, for which she was assistant editor and contributor from 1985 to 1987 and The Architects' Journal (London); The Architecture Bulletin; Architecture Australia; Architectural Theory Review; Architectural Record (New York); Architectural Design (Moscow); Metropole (New York); Statement (The Hague); and Bauwelt (Germany).

As well as analyses and reviews for academics and practitioners, Farrelly writes for the general public about the principles, morality, aesthetics and function of architecture, especially on Sydney. Critiques of major social issues encompass those relating to urban development, in particular transportation and building standards, as well as those relating to environmental degradation, and climate change.

Contributions for the general public appear in newspapers such as the New Zealand Herald and the National Business Review (NZ), and in The Sydney Morning Herald, for which she wrote a weekly column and regular essays until 2021. Writer Tim Blair has written about Farrelly in the Daily Telegraph, calling her a 'frightbat' and criticising her for charging people to work on her farm digging holes. Her essay on "the destructive myth of professionalism" was noted as among the editor's best comment pieces of 2015. Critiques concerning other significant Australian buildings include those relating to proposed changes to the Australian War Memorial in Canberra, and the proposed destruction of Sydney's Powerhouse Museum along with the break up of its unique collections. In December 2021, Farrelly's three-decade association with The Sydney Morning Herald came to an end when her column was terminated by editor Bevan Shields, after Farrelly had registered as a Labor Party candidate for Strathfield in the 2021 local government elections and had subsequently written a piece criticising Liberal and independent candidates in that election without declaring her own potential candidacy.

In her role as critic and commentator, Farrelly has had reviews of books and exhibitions published in a range of journals. She has also been interviewed by the television and radio media, including the Australian Broadcasting Corporation (ABC) and the BBC World Service. Reviews include "Superior Seidler - Review of Harry Seidler" in Architectural Review (London). Interviews include for the programs of Philip Adams, Mike Carlton, David Marr, Kerry O’Brien, Margaret Throsby, and Alan Saunders.

Public speaking 
Farrelly has been invited to speak at a wide range of public events, including panels, symposia, conferences, and festivals. Examples include as speaker in 2004 and 2005 on "Sydney's Working Harbour" at the Working Harbour Forum in the Sydney Town Hall; in July 2007 at the Byron Bay Writers Festival; in May 2009 and 2013 at the Sydney Writers' Festival; in October 2010 and 2015 at the Festival of Dangerous Ideas in the Sydney Opera House in October 2011 at the Adelaide Festival of Ideas; in October 2012 as panellist at the University of Sydney's Sesquicentenary Colloquium Dinner, where her topic was "Dreaming Spires: Architecture and the learning game"; in 2011 and 2012 as speaker at the Art After Hours program in the Art Gallery of New South Wales; in May 2012 at the Museum of Contemporary Art Australia on "Writing Architecture"; in August 2014 as keynote speaker at the Green Buildings Conference in South Africa; in October 2015 for the year's final Utzon lecture at the University of New South Wales on "Architecture and Morality," exploring the relationship between ethics and aesthetics in architecture; in 2015 at the New Zealand Institute of Architects and on "Beauty" at the St James Institute in Sydney; in 2018 on "Architecture, cities and houses, design, the arts, planning, the environment and social commentary" at Sydney University's Sydney Centennial Symposium: "Cathedral Thinking – Designing for the Next Century".

Published works

Books

Part books 

 (1991) " ‘Why Sydney Finds it so Hard to Shape Up,’ review of planning failures in Ultimo-Pyrmont" in Waterfront housing and inner city redevelopment: proceedings of the Sydney seminar, Lea, J.P. and Dalton S., (Eds), Ian Buchan Fell Research Centre, Faculty of Architecture, University of Sydney, Sydney 
 (1998) "Architecture and Urban Design" in The Best of Sydney, Ross Muller (ed), Sydney Morning Herald Books, Sydney, 
 (2005) "Pipedreaming the Harbour" in Sitelines: aspects of Sydney Harbour: a collection of essays celebrating Sydney Harbour, Federation Trust, 
(2005) "Powerhouse, Dreaming House", in Yesterday's Tomorrows: the Powerhouse Museum and its precursors 1880-2005, Graeme Davison and Kimberley Webber (eds), Powerhouse Publishing with UNSW Press, Haymarket, NSW, 
(2006)  "‘Beauty, Exclusionism and Stuff; the basis of community?’" in Talking about Sydney: population, community and culture in contemporary Sydney, Robert Freestone, Bill Randolph and Carol Butler-Bowdon (eds), UNSW Press with Historic Houses Trust, 
(2008) "‘Tall Tales’, the advent of Sydney high-rise" in Modern Times: the untold story of modernism in Australia, Ann Stephen, Philip Goad and Andrew McNamara (eds) Miegunyah Press, Carlton, Victoria,  
(2008) "Sidney Nolan" and "‘The Corner Shop" in Australian Greats, Peter Cochrane (ed) William Heinemann Australia, North Sydney NSW, 
(2009) "Sydney" in The Great Cities in History, John Julius Norwich (ed) London; New York, N.Y.: Thames & Hudson,

Awards for writing
 (1991) CICA International Award for Architectural Criticism (Paris)
 (1994) & (2002) Adrian Ashton Award for Architectural Writing
 (2001) Pascall Prize for Critical Writing
 (2002) Marion Mahony Griffin Prize

References

External links
 Elizabeth Farrelly website

Academic staff of the University of Sydney
University of Sydney alumni
Australian columnists
Living people
Sydney City Councillors
1957 births
Australian women architects
New Zealand women architects
Australian architecture writers
Architecture critics
People from Auckland
Writers from Sydney
New Zealand architects
Women local councillors in Australia
Australian women columnists